Michael Lind (born April 23, 1962) is an American writer and academic. He has explained and defended the tradition of American democratic nationalism in a number of books, beginning with The Next American Nation (1995). He is currently a professor at the Lyndon B. Johnson School of Public Affairs at the University of Texas at Austin.

Early life 
Lind is a fifth-generation Central Texan, of Swedish, English, Scottish and possibly German Jewish descent. Born in Austin, he was educated in Austin public schools. His father, Charles Ray Lind, was an assistant attorney general of Texas, and his mother, Marcia Hearon Lind, was a public school teacher and principal. He attended the Plan II Liberal Arts Honors Program at the University of Texas at Austin, graduating in 1982 with honors. He received a master's degree in International Relations from Yale University in 1985 and a J.D. from the University of Texas Law School in 1988.

Career 
Lind worked for the Heritage Foundation's State Department Assessment Project from 1988–90. After working as assistant to the director of the U.S. State Department's Center for the Study of Foreign Affairs from 1990–91, he was executive editor of The National Interest from 1991–94. He was an editor at Harper's Magazine from 1994–95, a senior editor at The New Republic from 1995–96, a staff writer at The New Yorker from 1996–97, and Washington Correspondent for Harper's Magazine from 1998–99.

In 1999 he co-founded the New America Foundation (now New America) with Ted Halstead, Sherle Schwenninger, and Walter Russell Mead. At New America from 1999–2017 he was at various times Whitehead Senior Fellow, co-founder and co-director of the American Strategy Project, co-director of the Next Social Contract Initiative and an ASU Future of War Fellow.

Since 2017, he has been a professor at the Lyndon B. Johnson School of Public Affairs at the University of Texas at Austin. He has taught courses on American democracy, American political economy and American foreign policy at Harvard, Johns Hopkins, and Virginia Tech's Arlington campus.

Views 

Lind has examined and defended the tradition of American democratic nationalism associated with Alexander Hamilton in a series of books, including The Next American Nation (1995), Hamilton’s Republic (1997), What Lincoln Believed (2004) and Land of Promise: An Economic History of the United States (2012). Lind has also written two books on American foreign policy, The American Way of Strategy (2006) and Vietnam: The Necessary War (1999). A former neoconservative in the tradition of New Deal liberalism; with the original neoconservatives being anti-Soviet liberals who drifted to the right, Lind criticized the American right in Up From Conservatism: Why the Right is Wrong for America (1996) and Made in Texas: George W. Bush and the Southern Takeover of American Politics (2004). According to an article published in The New York Times in 1995, Lind "defies the usual political categories of left and right, liberal and conservative."

In 1995, Lind criticized the systems of jury trials and common law, arguing that civil law trials are superior to common law trials, and that the civil law model of a mixed panel of professional and lay judges is preferable to juries. On the history of trial by jury in the United States, he wrote that "from independence until the civil rights revolution, the jury was a means by which white bigots legally lynched Indians, blacks and Asians (or acquitted their white murderers). Today urban black juries all too often put race above justice in the same manner." He argued that among other things, the process of discovery was much fairer in a civil law system.

In May 2015, Lind argued for the adoption of "enlightened nationalism", also called "liberal nationalism", in which the United States "would combine its security strategy of offshore balancing with intelligent economic nationalism". Regarding NATO and other American allies, a liberal nationalist foreign policy, Lind continued, "would shift much of the burden of the defense of its allies and protectorates to those countries themselves". He has argued for "an immigration policy in the national interest would shift the emphasis from family reunification to skills ... [and] enable long-term population growth ... compatible with the economic integration and cultural assimilation of newcomers to the United States".

Lind is an outspoken critic of libertarianism. He had observed that of the 195 countries in the world today, none is fully a libertarian society:

Works

Nonfiction
 (2020) The New Class War: Saving Democracy From The Managerial Elite. Penguin Random House. .
 (2018) Big Is Beautiful: Debunking the Myth of Small Business (with Robert D. Atkinson). MIT Press. . 
 (2012) Land of Promise: An Economic History of the United States. HarperCollins. .
 (2006) The American Way of Strategy: U.S. Foreign Policy and The American Way of Life. Oxford University Press. .
 (2005) What Lincoln Believed: The Values and Convictions of America’s Greatest President. Doubleday. .
 (2003) Made in Texas: George W. Bush and the Southern Takeover of American Politics. Basic Books. .
 (2001) The Radical Center: The Future of American Politics (with Ted Halstead). Doubleday. .
 (1999) Vietnam: The Necessary War: A Reinterpretation of America's Most Disastrous Military Conflict. Free Press. .
 (1997) Hamilton's Republic: Readings in the American Democratic Nationalist Tradition (editor). Free Press. .
 (1996) Up From Conservatism: Why the Right is Wrong for America. Free Press. .
 (1995) The Next American Nation: The New Nationalism and the Fourth American Revolution. Free Press. .

Fiction and poetry
 (2007) Parallel Lives. Etruscan Press. .
 (2003) Bluebonnet Girl. Henry Holt. .
 (2002) When You Are Someone Else. Aralia Press.
 (1997) The Alamo: An Epic. Houghton Mifflin. .
 (1996) Powertown. HarperCollins. .

References

External links

1962 births
20th-century American historians
American male non-fiction writers
20th-century American male writers
21st-century American historians
21st-century American male writers
American foreign policy writers
American male journalists
American people of British descent
American people of German-Jewish descent
American people of Swedish descent
American people of Scottish descent
American political writers
American nationalists
Harvard Law School faculty
Living people
Radical centrist writers
University of Texas School of Law alumni
University of Texas at Austin faculty
Writers from Austin, Texas
Yale University alumni
Historians from Texas